Thomas Curtis "T. C." Dantzler (born October 26, 1970 in Harvey, Illinois) is an American Greco-Roman wrestler, who competed for the men's 74-kg category at the 2008 Summer Olympics in Beijing. He is a two-time U.S national champion, five-time U.S. world wrestling team member, and a resident athlete at the U.S. Olympic Training Center in Colorado Springs, Colorado. He is also a two-time bronze medalist at the Pan American Games.

Early life and education
Dantzler, a native of Harvey, Illinois, attended Thornwood High School, where he was a runner-up in the state wrestling tournament. He also earned letters in football, baseball, and track and field, while studying at Thornwood. After graduating from high school, Danzler attended Northern Illinois University in DeKalb, Illinois, where he received a bachelor's degree in economics, and was a four-time qualifying wrestler at the NCAA tournament (1990–1993).

Wrestling career
Although he never won a state tournament title in wrestling during his high school years or national title in wrestling during his collegiate career, Dantzler had been a regular member of the U.S. national wrestling team. In 1995, he moved from Illinois to Colorado Springs, Colorado to work and train as a resident athlete at the U.S. Olympic Training Center. He first competed for the men's 74-kg category at the U.S. national championships in 1996, and finally received his first title ten years later. At the span of his wrestling career, he placed third six times, and runner-up three times, and also, defended titles in the same tournament in 2007 and in 2008. In addition to his numerous achievements in the national championships, Dantzler finished third at the 2000 U.S. Olympic trials, and was denied a chance to qualify for his weight class at the 2004 Summer Olympics. He also competed at the 2006 World Wrestling Championships in Guangzhou, China, where he placed fifth in the same category.

Having achieved his best finish at the World Championships, Dantzler qualified for the 2007 Pan American Games in Rio de Janeiro, Brazil, and competed for the 74-kg category in men's Greco-Roman wrestling. He lost in the first preliminary round to Cuba's Odelis Herrero, who eventually won the gold medal in this category, but managed to bounce back into the repechage bouts to repeat his bronze winning streak from the 2003 Pan American Games in Santo Domingo. Dantzler later recaptured his success in Greco-Roman wrestling, when he knocked off his former opponent Herrero at the 2008 Pan American Wrestling Championships in Colorado Springs, but ended up with a silver medal, after losing out to Peru's Sixto Barrera in the final match. Dantzler received an elusive qualifying berth at the 2008 Summer Olympics in Beijing, after winning the U.S. Olympic trials for his respective weight class.

Olympic Games
At age thirty-seven, Dantzler became the second-oldest U.S. wrestler to compete at the Olympics, with a difference of one month from Christopher Campbell, who previously won the bronze medal in men's freestyle wrestling at the 1992 Summer Olympics in Barcelona. He made his debut at the 2008 Summer Olympics in Beijing, and qualified for the men's 74-kg class in Greco-Roman wrestling. Despite of his age and first-time participation, Dantzler lost in the first preliminary round of the competition, after being defeated by Hungary's Péter Bácsi, with a three-set score (1–5, 2–2, 0–3), and a classification point score of 1–3. After losing his match in the first round, Dantzler later admitted that he was slowly reacting, because he had to speed up reducing weight due to faulty scale.

Post-wrestling career
After the Olympics, Dantzler retired from his sporting career, and worked as a founder, president, and CEO of TC logiQ, a software development company which specialized in employment or volunteer background checks for its business clients. TC is NO LONGER with TC logiQ, Inc in any capacity. In his current businesses 2020 Screening, Optimum Screening and Be Sure Background Checks conduct more than 2 million criminal background searches annually for a variety of organizations, including national governing bodies of Olympic sports, Healthcare systems and dating website such as seeking.com. He is currently living in Colorado Springs, Colorado where he runs day to day and strategic planning and operations for https://www.2020screening.com/, https://www.optimumscreening.net/, and https://www.besurebackgroundchecks.com/. These three companies are The Background screening Industries Premier company In three phases of background screening. 2020 screening Employment background screening, Optimum screening Dating websites In large memberships such as not-for-profit and youth sports. And Be sure background checks  For Self pre-employment Criminal background screen And drug test.

References

External links 
Business website 
Business website
Business website
NBC 2008 Olympics profile

1970 births
Living people
Wrestlers at the 2003 Pan American Games
Wrestlers at the 2007 Pan American Games
Wrestlers at the 2008 Summer Olympics
Olympic wrestlers of the United States
People from Harvey, Illinois
Sportspeople from Colorado Springs, Colorado
American male sport wrestlers
Pan American Games bronze medalists for the United States
Pan American Games medalists in wrestling
Medalists at the 2003 Pan American Games
20th-century American people
21st-century American people